Giuseppe Verdi's String Quartet in E minor was written in the spring of 1873 during a production of Aida in Naples. It is the only surviving chamber music  work in Verdi's catalogue.

History
Verdi's production of Aida in early March, 1873 was delayed due to the sudden illness of soprano Teresa Stolz. Verdi focused his time in Naples on the writing of his first chamber work, the String Quartet in E minor. The work was premiered two days after the opening of Aida  during an informal recital at his hotel on April 1, 1873. The names of the original performers survive only as Pinto brothers, violins, Salvadore, viola, and Giarritiello, cello.

Verdi commented on the work, saying "I've written a Quartet in my leisure moments in Naples. I had it performed one evening in my house, without attaching the least importance to it and without inviting anyone in particular. Only the seven or eight persons who usually come to visit me were present. I don't know whether the Quartet is beautiful or ugly, but I do know that it's a Quartet!"

The quartet also exists in a version for string orchestra by Arturo Toscanini.

Structure

The Quartet is scored for the usual string quartet complement of two violins, viola, and cello.

Allegro
Andantino
Prestissimo
Scherzo Fuga. Allegro assai mosso

References
Footnotes

Bibliography

External links
 String Quartet in E Minor Link to the score at the International Music Score Library Project

Chamber music by Giuseppe Verdi
Verdi
1873 compositions
Compositions in E minor